On September 19, 2007 Hofstra established the Wilbur F. Breslin Center for Real Estate Studies.
Mr. Wilbur F. Breslin (The founder of Breslin Realty and former Hofstra Board member), the man responsible for some of Long Island's big commercial projects helped launch Hofstra University's Wilbur F. Breslin Center for Real Estate Studies, where industry professionals, government officials, the public and students can convene to tackle some of Long Island's biggest problems; Like sprawl, the subprime collapse, more respect for real estate professionals, etc. The new venture will take a multidisciplinary approach to real estate, with programs that encompass zoning law, market forces, taxes and other issues. The center is expected to serve as a think tank analyzing issues and also a resource for consumers. It opens at a time when university and some industry officials believe real estate issues, from mortgages to the environment, are more complex than ever. "The Breslin Center will generate an innovative and scholarly discussion about how real estate issues impact our region and society," said Hofstra president, Stuart Rabinowitz. "It will give the study of real estate the kind of economic analysis it has not yet received."
Mr. Breslin's latest gift of $2.25 million to the university will help fund the center.